The 336th Fighter Squadron (336th FS), nicknamed the Rocketeers, is a United States Air Force unit.   It is assigned to the 4th Operations Group and stationed at Seymour Johnson Air Force Base, North Carolina.

The 336th was constituted on 22 August 1942 as an incorporation of the Royal Air Force No. 133 Squadron into the United States Army Air Forces' VIII Fighter Command.   No. 133 Squadron was one of three RAF Eagle Squadrons composed of American volunteer pilots who enlisted in the RAF and fought in World War II prior to the United States entry into the war.

At the height of conversion training, the 4th TFW was one of the first units tasked to react to Iraq's invasion of Kuwait in August 1990. The 335th and 336th Tactical Fighter Squadrons and support personnel deployed to Saudi Arabia, beginning in August 1990. The combat record of the 4th TFW in Saudi Arabia was exceptional, with the 336th TFS flying 1,088 combat missions during Operation Desert Storm. The unit dropped more than six-million pounds of bombs on Scud missile sites, bridges and airfields. Most of the missions were flown at night.

Overview
The "Rocketeers" fly the McDonnell-Douglas (now Boeing) F-15E Strike Eagle.  It was the first operational F-15E squadron in the Air Force.  Its aircraft are identified by the "SJ" tail code and yellow fin flash.

Currently the squadron provides worldwide deployable aircraft and personnel capable of executing combat missions in support of worldwide Aerospace Expeditionary Force deployments to combat areas as part of the Global War on Terrorism.  To date, the 336th have destroyed 459 enemy aircraft including the 4th Fighter Wing's sole MiG kill in Vietnam.

History

World War II

On 23 September 1942 the 4th Fighter Group moved to its initial airfield at RAF Debden; however, the 336th moved to a satellite field at RAF Great Sampford.   They conducted operations from there until rejoining the group at Debden on 30 October 1942.

Fighter aircraft escorted first bombing raid over Berlin, March 1944. On 21 June 1944, escorted bombers in the first shuttle bombing mission from England to Russia. Received Distinguished Unit Citation (DUC) for destroying enemy aircraft and attacking air bases in France, 5 March – 24 April 1944.

Cold War
In 1946 trained in jet aircraft; participated in air shows around the US; began night flying in late 1947.

Combat in Korea, December 1950 – July 1953. Received second and third DUCs for combat in Korean War, 22 April – 8 July 1951 and 9 July – 27 November 1951.

Deployed to Florida in October 1962 during Cuban missile crisis.

From January–June 1968, deployed to Korea; tasked with operations associated with USS Pueblo incident. Combat in Southeast Asia, April–September 1972 and March 1973.

During the 1980s, trained in combat readiness in order to maintain worldwide commitment and air-to-air mission capability. Deployed to Europe under dual-based mission concept in support of NATO objectives, 1978–1985.

Participated in initial attack on Iraq, 17 January 1991.  During 1990–1994, shared quarterly rotation duties to Southwest Asia with 334th and 335th Fighter Squadrons.

Modern Era
Since 1991, trained as combat ready fighter squadron prepared for rapid worldwide deployment of fighter aircraft to accomplish air-to-ground, air-to-air, strategic attack and deep interdiction missions.

Deployed to combat areas in Middle East as part of Global War on Terrorism, 2001–present.

On 18 July 2009, F-15E serial 90-231 from the 336th Fighter Squadron crashed in eastern Afghanistan, killing the two-man crew, Captain Mark R. McDowell and Captain Thomas J. Gramith.  The US military reported that the jet was not downed by enemy action.

Air Combat Command officials announced a stand down and reallocation of flying hours for the rest of the fiscal year 2013 due to mandatory budget cuts.   The across-the board spending cuts, called sequestration, took effect 1 March when Congress failed to agree on a deficit-reduction plan. Squadrons either stood down on a rotating basis or kept combat ready or at a reduced readiness level called "basic mission capable" for part or all of the remaining months in fiscal 2013. This affected the 336th Fighter Squadron with a stand-down grounding from 9 April-30 September 2013.

In October 2021, the Rocketeers deployed to Larissa Air Base, Greece, to participate in Exercise Castle Forge.

Lineage
 Constituted as the 336th Fighter Squadron on 22 August 1942
 Activated on 12 September 1942
 Redesignated 336th Fighter Squadron, Single Engine on 20 August 1943
 Inactivated on 10 November 1945
 Activated on 9 September 1946
 Redesignated 336th Fighter Squadron, Jet Propelled on 23 April 1947
 Redesignated 336th Fighter Squadron, Jet on 14 June 1948
 Redesignated 336th Fighter-Interceptor Squadron on 20 January 1950
 Redesignated 336th Fighter-Bomber Squadron on 8 March 1955
 Redesignated 336th Fighter-Day Squadron on 25 April 1956
 Redesignated 336th Tactical Fighter Squadron on 1 July 1958
 Redesignated 336th Fighter Squadron on 1 November 1991

Assignments
 4th Fighter Group, 12 September 1942 – 10 November 1945
 4th Fighter Group (later 4th Fighter-Interceptor Group, 4th Fighter-Bomber Group, 4th Fighter-Day Group), 9 September 1946
 Attached to 49th Fighter-Bomber Wing, 19 November 1954; 18th Fighter-Bomber Wing, 7 August 1956; 313th Air Division, after 1 February 1957
 4th Fighter-Day Wing (later 4th Tactical Fighter Wing, 4th) Wing), 8 December 1957
 Attached to 65th Air Division, 12 August 1963 – 7 January 1964; Seventeenth Air Force, 25 May–30 August 1965; 8th Tactical Fighter Wing, 12 April–30 September 1972 and 9 March–7 September 1973; 314th Air Division, 22 March–17 April 1977; 86th Tactical Fighter Wing, 11 September–13 October 1978, 31 August–1 October 1979, 26 August–26 September 1980, 5 September–3 October 1983 and 26 August–26 September 1985; 4th Tactical Fighter Wing (Deployed), 9 August–20 December 1990; 4th Tactical Fighter Wing Provisional, 20 December 1990 – c. 13 March 1991
 4th Operations Group, 22 April 1991 – present

Stations

 RAF Bushey Hall (AAF-341), England, 12 September 1942
 RAF Debden (AAF-356), England, 29 September 1942
 RAF Steeple Morden (AAF-122), England, c. 23 July–4 November 1945
 Camp Kilmer, New Jersey, 9–10 November 1945
 Selfridge Field, Michigan, 9 September 1946
 Andrews Field (later Andrews Air Force Base), Maryland, 26 March 1947
 Langley Air Force Base, Virginia, 2 May 1949
 Dover Air Force Base, Delaware, 13 August–11 November 1950
 Johnson Air Base, Japan, 13 December 1950
 Taegu Air Base (K-2), South Korea, 15 March 1951
 Suwon Air Base (K-13), South Korea, c. 6 April 1951
 Johnson Air Base, Japan, 27 June 1951
 Kimpo Air Base (K-14), South Korea, 20 September 1951
 Misawa Air Base, Japan, 19 November 1954
 Kadena Air Base, Okinawa, 7 August 1956

 Seymour Johnson Air Force Base, North Carolina, 8 December 1957 – present
 Deployed to McCoy Air Force Base, Florida, 21 October–29 November 1962; Moron Air Base, Spain, 12 August 1963 – 7 January 1964; Incirlik Air Base, Turkey, 25 May–30 August 1965; Ubon Royal Thai Air Force Base, Thailand, 12 April–30 September 1972 and 9 March–7 September 1973; Suwon Air Base, South Korea, 25 March–17 April 1977; Ramstein Air Base, West Germany, 11 September–13 October 1978, 31 August–1 October 1979, 26 August–26 September 1980, 5 September–3 October 1983, and 26 August–26 September 1985; Seeb International Airport, Thumrait Oman, 9 August 1990; Al Karj Air Base, Saudi Arabia, 18 December 1990-c. 13 March 1991

Aircraft
Aircraft operated include:

Supermarine Spitfire Mk.Vb (Sept 42–1 Apr 1943)
Republic P-47C Thunderbolt (10 Mar 1943–Feb 1944)
Republic P-47D Thunderbolt (June 1943–Feb 1944; 1947)
North American P-51B Mustang (25 Feb 1944–1945)
North American P-51D Mustang (June 1944–1945)
North American P-51K Mustang (Dec 1944–1945)

Lockheed F-80 Shooting Star (1947–1949)
North American F-86 Sabre (1949–1958)
North American F-100C Super Sabre (Dec 1957–1960)
Republic F-105 Thunderchief (1959–1967)
McDonnell Douglas F-4D Phantom II (1967–1970)
McDonnell Douglas F-4E Phantom II (1970–1988)
McDonnell Douglas F-15E Strike Eagle (1988–present)

Notable squadron members
Vermont Garrison
Don Gentile
John Godfrey
James Robinson Risner

Emblems

References

Notes
 Explanatory notes

 Citations

Bibliography

 
 
 Freeman, Roger A. The Mighty Eighth War Diary (1990) Motorbooks International
 The Mighty Eighth: A History of the Units, men and Machines of the US 8th Air Force (1991) Motorbooks International
 The Mighty Eighth War Manual (1991) Motorbooks International
 
 
 
 iCasualties.org: Operation Enduring Freedom http://icasualties.org/OEF/ByNationality.aspx

External links
336th Fighter Squadron Official Unit Website Referenced 29 January 2006
336th Fighter Squadron GlobalSecurity.org Referenced 29 January 2006
4th Fighter Group WWII Official WWII Association Website Referenced 4 March 2012

336
Military units and formations in North Carolina
Fighter squadrons of the United States Army Air Forces